"Levitate" is a song by the British band Hadouken! It was released on 20 January 2013 as the fifth single from their third studio album Every Weekend (2013). It was produced by British duo Loadstar and Dutch bass music trio Noisia (under their Nightwatch alias). The song was made popular by the band's People Are Awesome 2013 viral video that has accumulated over 120 million YouTube views.

Track listing

Chart performance

Weekly charts

Year-end charts

Release history

References

2013 singles
2013 songs
Hadouken! songs